Elżbieta Barbara Witek (née Zbanuch; born 17 December 1957) is a Polish politician and former Minister of the Interior and Administration, in office from June 2019 to August 2019, currently serving as the Marshal of the Sejm. First elected to the Sejm on 25 September 2005, obtaining 7476 votes in 1 Legnica district as a candidate on the Law and Justice list. She was voted Marshal on 9 August 2019 after her predecessor, Marek Kuchciński, stepped down upon the mass critique of his use of government airplanes for private purposes.

Orders and honours
 Order of Prince Yaroslav the Wise

See also
Members of Polish Sejm 2005–2007

References

External links
Elżbieta Witek – parliamentary page – includes declarations of interest, voting record, and transcripts of speeches.

1957 births
Living people
People from Jawor
Members of the Polish Sejm 2005–2007
Women members of the Sejm of the Republic of Poland
Law and Justice politicians
21st-century Polish women politicians
Marshals of the Sejm of the Third Polish Republic
Members of the Polish Sejm 2007–2011
Members of the Polish Sejm 2011–2015
Members of the Polish Sejm 2015–2019
Members of the Polish Sejm 2019–2023
Interior ministers of Poland
University of Wrocław alumni
20th-century Polish women
Women legislative speakers